Elizabeth Louis Jones (née Lloyd; 28 April 1889 – 14 May 1952) was a Welsh scholar.

Biography
She was born Elizabeth Jane Lloyd in 1889 in Llanilar, Ceredigion, the only child of timber merchant John Lloyd, and his wife Elizabeth (née Edwards). She was first educated at Aberystwyth County School and later went to Aberystwyth University where she graduated with first class honours in Welsh in 1911. She was awarded a Fellowship by the University and studied mostly in libraries situated in London and Oxford for a further three years. In London, she and her close friend, the composer Morfydd Llwyn Owen, were assisted by Liberal politician Herbert Lewis and his wife Ruth.

Jones later received a prize and medal at the National Eisteddfod of Wales, held in Wrexham, for an essay on the Eisdeddfod's history in 1912. She gained a master's degree for a thesis on the Eisteddfod the following year. In 1916 she was appointed to a post at Bangor Normal College as a lecturer in English and Welsh.

Jones met E. Louis Jones, a solicitor from Llanfyllin and the son of Dr Richard Jones; they were married the following year and had four children, two of which died in infancy. Alongside Professor Henry Lewis she published Mynegai i farddoniaeth y llawysgrifau, an index to manuscript poetry, in 1928. Jones died on 14 May 1952 in Wrexham and was buried in Llanfyllin.

References

1889 births
1952 deaths
Welsh scholars and academics
People from Ceredigion
Alumni of Aberystwyth University